Callahan is a town in Nassau County, Florida, United States, adjacent to Duval County. The population was 1,123 at the 2010 census. It is one location of the Northeast Florida Fair.

The Battle of Alligator Bridge took place around Callahan on June 30, 1778, and was the only major engagement in an unsuccessful campaign to conquer British East Florida during the American Revolutionary War.

Geography

Demographics

At the 2000 census there were 962 people, 411 households, and 256 families living in the town. The population density was 724.9 inhabitants per square mile (279.3/km). The racial makeup of the town was 85.86% White, 10.60% African American, 0.83% Native American, 0.21% Asian, 0.52% from other races, and 1.98% from two or more races. Hispanic or Latino of any race were 2.49%.

Of the 411 households 33.6% had children under the age of 18 living with them, 37.0% were married couples living together, 20.7% had a female householder with no husband present, and 37.5% were non-families. 32.6% of households were one person and 16.3% were one person aged 65 or older.  The average household size was 2.34 and the average family size was 2.95.

The age distribution was 28.4% under the age of 18, 12.4% from 18 to 24, 25.5% from 25 to 44, 20.9% from 45 to 64, and 12.9% 65 or older.  The median age was 33 years. For every 100 females there were 78.5 males.  For every 100 females age 18 and over, there were 74.9 males.

The median household income was $25,234 and the median family income  was $32,167. Males had a median income of $27,422 versus $23,036 for females. The per capita income for the town was $14,710.  About 14.8% of families and 21.9% of the population were below the poverty line, including 30.6% of those under age 18 and 18.7% of those age 65 or over.

Education

Callahan Elementary and Callahan Intermediate Schools serve grades K–5, Callahan Middle School serves 6–8, and West Nassau High School has grades 9–12.  Sonshine Christian Academy, a co-ed private school affiliated with the Assembly of God, instructs Pre-Kindergarten through 12th
grade

Nassau County Public Library operates the Callahan Branch Library.

Transportation

Area roads
Callahan lies at the intersection of US 1, which is also part of US 23 as well as  US 301, the northern terminus of  Florida State Road A1A  and  Florida State Road 200. US Routes 1 and 23 run together northbound in an overlap from the Grand Park section of Northwest Jacksonville through the St. Mary's River.  US 301 joins US 1 and 23 from an overlap with hidden State Road 200, that begins as far south as Ocala. SR 200 itself joins a wrong way concurrency with SR A1A into Fernandina Beach. Florida State Road 115 runs from the Deercreek section of Southeast Jacksonville and terminates with US 1 and 23 south of downtown, but contains a de facto extension at the northern edges of town in the form of CR 115 on  Kings Road and Old Dixie Highway. CR 108 is known as North Brandies Avenue then becomes Saint George Road as it loops around western Nassau County then curves to the east while passing through Hillard where it runs through another intersection with US 1, 23 and 301. The road continues east through northern rural Nassau County briefly passing through Evergreen, and finally terminates at US 17 north of Becker.

Railroads 
Two railroad lines exist within Callahan; The CSX Nahunta Subdivision, a former Atlantic Coast Line Railroad line which runs from the Jacksonville Terminal Subdivision in Jacksonville to the Savannah Subdivision in Savannah, Georgia, and the CSX Callahan Subdivision. a former Seaboard Air Line Railroad line which runs south to a junction in Baldwin that includes the Wildwood Subdivision the former Tallahassee Subdivision and another leg of the Jacksonville Terminal Subdivision. Two former SAL lines that extended from the Callahan Subdivision were an abandoned segment of the Fernandina Subdivision and the Gross Cutoff.

Infrastructure
Nassau County Fire Rescue operates Station 50 in Callahan.

Notable people

 Howie Kendrick, Major League Baseball player for the Anaheim Angels, Los Angeles Dodgers and Washington Nationals
 Frank Murphy, former NFL player for the Chicago Bears, Tampa Bay Buccaneers and Houston Texans

References

Towns in Nassau County, Florida
Towns in the Jacksonville metropolitan area